Benedict Akwuegbu (born 3 November 1974) is a retired Nigerian football striker.

He played for Nigerian national football team and was a 2002 FIFA World Cup participant.

Club career

Early career
Akwuegbu started his career at the age of 15 in Nigeria before moving to French outfit RC Lens at the age of 17. Then he spent five years in Belgium with KRC Harelbeke, KSV Waregem, KVK Tienen. Austrian side Grazer AK signed him after the 1998 season.

Grazer AK
Grazer AK won the Austrian Cup and Austrian Supercup in 2000 and 2002 and the league title in 2004 with his good performance. He won the Best Foreign Player and nicknamed "Austrian Bomber" by the press. He played in 20 European games as he scored 12 including some remarkable goals. He attracted several Bundesliga clubs like Hamburger SV and 1. FC Kaiserslautern. However Grazer AK refused the offer from Kaiserslautern.

Qingdao Jonoon
In April 2007, Akwuegbu was signed by Qingdao Jonoon. He scored his first goal for Qingdao on 13 May 2007, an 84-minute equalizer in a 3–2 loss away at Shanghai Schenhua. Qingdao Janoon boss, Yin Tiesheng spoke very high about him and his performance in the media, Akwuegbu became one of the most consistent players in the Qingdao squad.
He was a vital part in Qingdao attack throughout the campaign and notched six goals in 20 games. Akwuegbu had an excellent season and was favorite of Qingdao Janoon fans.

Basingstoke Town
Akwuegbu then joined Basingstoke Town in the Conference South. He scored his first goal for the Dragons against Dorchester Town on 5 April 2010. He was released at the end of the season.

International career
Akwuegbu was selected to U-16 World Cup Final squad in 1989 hosted by Scotland. However, he never had the chance to play as sitting on the bench in all four matches without substitution. Nigeria was beaten by eventual winner Saudi Arabia at the quarter-final stage. He also played for the U-20 national side.

In 2000, his success in Austria made him joining the Africa Cup of Nations tournament which he played his first international game against Tunisia. With his progress in the team he was involved in the 2002 World Cup Qualifier and scoring two goals in the process, His performance made him selected to the 2002 World Cup Final squad. He played the only World Cup game against England.

Honours

Grazer AK
 Austrian Football Bundesliga: 2003–04; runner-up 2002–03
 Austrian Cup: 2000, 2002
 Austrian Supercup': 2000, 2002

International
Africa Cup of Nations: Runner-up: 2000

References

External links 
 

1974 births
Living people
Sportfreunde Siegen players
S.C. Eendracht Aalst players
Grazer AK players
FC Kärnten players
FC Wacker Innsbruck (2002) players
FC St. Gallen players
Panserraikos F.C. players
Changsha Ginde players
Basingstoke Town F.C. players
Tianjin Jinmen Tiger F.C. players
Qingdao Hainiu F.C. (1990) players
Chinese Super League players
China League One players
Challenger Pro League players
Austrian Football Bundesliga players
2. Bundesliga players
Swiss Super League players
Nigerian footballers
Nigeria international footballers
Nigeria youth international footballers
Nigerian expatriate footballers
Nigerian expatriate sportspeople in Malta
Nigerian expatriate sportspeople in China
Expatriate footballers in Belgium
Expatriate footballers in Austria
Expatriate footballers in Switzerland
Expatriate footballers in Greece
Expatriate footballers in China
Nigerian expatriate sportspeople in the United Kingdom
2000 African Cup of Nations players
2002 FIFA World Cup players
K.V.K. Tienen-Hageland players
Association football forwards
K.R.C. Zuid-West-Vlaanderen players
Sportspeople from Jos